James Rivière (born 1949) is an Italian artist, designer, and sculptor. His  jewellery designs are held in private collections, and in museums including the Louvre, Victoria and Albert, and Vatican Museums.

He is a faculty member at Istituto Europeo di Design, Milan.

References

Further reading 
 James Rivière, Gioielli Verso il Futuro, Agrifoglio, Milano 1991.
 James Rivière, Gioielli tra Arte e Design, Collana Grandi Gioiellieri, Leonardo Arte Editore – Gruppo Mondatori Editori, Milano 1998.
L’Adorazione del Bramantino, Enigma Milanese, Electa – Kalliste Arte, Milano 2004.
 Luciana Baldrighi, Diario di Città, milanesi in galleria, Sperling & Kupfer Editori, Ottobre 2000 Piacenza p. 222-223.
 Guido Vergani, Dizionario della Moda, Baldini & Castaldi–Pitti Immagine, Firenze, 1998
Dictionnaire International du Bijou, edition du Regard, Paris, 1999
Fashion Dictionary, Baldini & Castaldi–Pitti Immagine, Firenze, 1999
 Lia Lenti e Maria Cristina Bergesio, Dizionario del Gioiello Italiano del XIX e XX secolo, Umberto Alemanni&Co, p. 243.

1949 births
Italian sculptors
Italian male sculptors
Living people
Italian jewellery designers